The 1993 Gent–Wevelgem was the 55th edition of the Gent–Wevelgem cycle race and was held on 7 April 1993. The race started in Ghent and finished in Wevelgem. The race was won by Mario Cipollini of the GB–MG Maglificio team.

General classification

References

Gent–Wevelgem
1993 in road cycling
1993 in Belgian sport